Monirul Islam is a first-class and List A cricketer from Bangladesh.  He was born on 25 August 1980 in Khulna, Bangladesh and is a right-handed batsman and slow left arm orthodox spin bowler.   He is sometimes known by his nickname "Taj".  He made his first-class debut for Khulna Division in 2001/02 and played through the 2006/07 season.

He has made one first-class hundred, an unbeaten 118 against Dhaka Division, and five first-class fifties.  His best bowling, 2 for 78, also came against Dhaka Division.  He has scored two fifties in List A one-day games. He is a coach at Sheikh Jamal Cricket Academy.

References

Bangladeshi cricketers
Khulna Division cricketers
Living people
1980 births